Flat Islands is a resettled community in Placentia Bay in Newfoundland and Labrador.

Ghost towns in Newfoundland and Labrador